Shalahi Rural District is a rural district (dehestan) in the Central District of Abadan County, Khuzestan Province, Iran. At the 2006 census, its population was 19,299, in 3,570 families.  The rural district has 14 villages.

References 

Rural Districts of Khuzestan Province
Abadan County